The 1972–73 Egyptian Premier League, was the 18th season of the Egyptian Premier League, the top Egyptian professional league for association football clubs, since its establishment in 1948. The season started on 6 October 1972 and concluded on 22 April 1973.
Ghazl El Mahalla managed to win the league for the first time in the club's history.

League table

 (C)= Champion, (R)= Relegated, Pld = Matches played; W = Matches won; D = Matches drawn; L = Matches lost; F = Goals for; A = Goals against; ± = Goal difference; Pts = Points.

Top goalscorers

Teams location

References

External links 
 All Egyptian Competitions Info

5
1972–73 in African association football leagues
1972–73 in Egyptian football